The 1821 New Hampshire gubernatorial election was held on March 13, 1821.

Incumbent Democratic-Republican Governor Samuel Bell won re-election to a third term.

General election

Major candidates
Samuel Bell, Democratic-Republican, incumbent Governor

Minor candidates
The following candidates may not have been formally nominated and attracted only scattering votes.

William Hale, Federalist, former U.S. Representative
Jeremiah Mason, Federalist, former U.S. Senator, Federalist nominee for Governor in 1818
David L. Morril, Democratic-Republican, incumbent U.S. Senator
George B. Upham, Federalist, former U.S. Representative, former Speaker of the New Hampshire House of Representatives

Results

References

Notes

1821
New Hampshire
Gubernatorial